Robert P. Wilmot (born 1954) is an Irish retired hurler and Gaelic footballer who played for Cork Championship club Bandon and at inter5-county level with the Cork senior football team. He usually lined out at wing-back or midfield.

Career

Wilmot first came to prominence as a dual player with the Bandon club. He played at juvenile and underage levels as a member of the Bandon minor hurling team that won five consecutive West Cork MHC titles before later winning Cork JFC (as captain) and Cork IHC titles. Wilmot first appeared on the inter-county scene as a dual player with the respective Cork minor teams. He lined out in three minor finals across both codes in the space of a year, winning the All-Ireland MFC title in 1972, before later winning a Munster U21FC. Wilmot joined the Cork senior football team during the 1972-73 National League and was an unused substitute when Cork beat Galway to win the 1973 All-Ireland Championship. He also secured two Munster Championship medals during his brief inter-county career.

Honours

Bandon 
Cork Intermediate Hurling Championship: 1974
Cork Junior Football Championship: 1975 (c)

Cork
All-Ireland Senior Football Championship: 1973
Munster Senior Football Championship: 1973, 1974
Munster Under-21 Football Championship: 1974
All-Ireland Minor Football Championship: 1971
Munster Minor Football Championship: 1971, 1972
Munster Minor Hurling Championship: 1971

References

1954 births
Living people
Bandon hurlers
Bandon Gaelic footballers
Carbery Gaelic footballers
Cork inter-county Gaelic footballers